Come and See is a 1985 Soviet anti-war film directed by Elem Klimov and starring Aleksei Kravchenko and Olga Mironova. Its screenplay, written by Klimov and Ales Adamovich, is based on the 1971 novel "Khatyn" and the 1977 memoir I Am from the Fiery Village, of which Adamovich was a co-author. Klimov had to fight eight years of censorship from the Soviet authorities before he could be allowed to produce the film in its entirety.

The film's plot focuses on the Nazi German occupation of Belarus, and the events as witnessed by a young Belarusian partisan teenager named Flyora, who—against his mother's wishes—joins the Belarusian resistance movement, and thereafter depicts the Nazi atrocities and human suffering inflicted upon the Eastern European region's populace. The film mixes hyper-realism with an underlying surrealism, and philosophical existentialism with poetical, psychological, political and apocalyptic themes.

Come and See received generally positive critical reception upon release, and received the FIPRESCI prize at the 14th Moscow International Film Festival. It has since come to be considered one of the greatest films of all time; in the 2022 Sight & Sound directors' poll, it ranked 41st.

Plot
In 1943, two Belarusian boys dig in a sand-filled trench looking for abandoned rifles in order to join the Soviet partisan forces. Their village elder warns them not to dig up the weapons as it would arouse the suspicions of the occupying Germans. One of the boys, Flyora, finds an SVT-40 rifle. The boys' activities are noticed by an Fw 189 reconnaissance aircraft, flying overhead.

The next day two partisans arrive at Flyora's house, to conscript him. Flyora becomes a low-rank militiaman and is ordered to perform menial tasks. When the partisans are ready to move on, the commander, Kosach, says that Flyora is to remain behind at the camp. Bitterly disappointed, Flyora walks into the forest weeping and meets Glasha, a girl working as a nurse for the partisans, and the two bond before the camp is suddenly attacked by German paratroopers and dive bombers.

Flyora is partially deafened from the explosions before the two hide in the forest to avoid the German soldiers. Flyora and Glasha travel to his village, only to find his home deserted and covered in flies. Denying that his family is dead, Flyora believes that they are hiding on a nearby island across a bog. As they run from the village in the direction of the bogland, Glasha glances across her shoulder, seeing a pile of executed villagers' bodies stacked behind a house, but does not alert Flyora.

The two become hysterical after wading through the bog, where Glasha then screams at Flyora that his family is actually dead in the village, resulting in the latter attempting to drown her. They are soon met by Rubezh, a partisan fighter, who takes them to a large group of villagers who have fled the Germans. Flyora sees the village elder, badly burnt by the Germans, who tells him that he witnessed his family's execution and that he should not have dug up the rifles. Flyora, hearing this, attempts suicide out of guilt, but Glasha and the villagers save and comfort him.

Rubezh takes Flyora and two other men to find food at a nearby warehouse, only to find it being guarded by German troops. During their retreat, the group unknowingly wanders through a minefield resulting in the deaths of the two companions. That evening Rubezh and Flyora sneak up to an occupied village and manage to steal a cow from a collaborating farmer. As they escape across an open field, Rubezh and the cow are shot and killed by a German machine gun. The next morning, Flyora attempts to steal a horse and cart, but the owner catches him and instead of doing him harm, he helps hide Flyora's identity when SS troops approach.

Flyora is taken to the village of Perekhody, where they hurriedly discuss a fake identity for him, while the SS unit, accompanied by collaborators from Schutzmannschaft Battalion 118, surround and occupy the village. Flyora tries to warn the townsfolk as they are being herded to their deaths, but is forced to join them inside a wooden church. Flyora and a young woman are allowed to escape the church, but the latter is dragged by her hair into a truck to be gang raped. Flyora is forced to watch as several Molotov cocktails and grenades are thrown onto and within the church before it is further set ablaze with a flamethrower as other soldiers shoot into the building. A German officer points a gun to Flyora's head to pose for a picture before leaving him to slump to the ground as the soldiers leave.

Flyora later wanders out of the scorched village in the direction of the Germans, where he discovers they had been ambushed by the partisans. After recovering his jacket and rifle, Flyora comes across Glora who escaped the church with him in a fugue state, her legs and face covered in blood after having been gang-raped and brutalized by the soldiers. Flyora returns to the village and finds that his fellow partisans have captured eleven of the Germans and their collaborators, including the commander, an SS-Sturmbannführer. While some of the captured men including the commander and main collaborator plead for their lives and deflect blame, a young fanatical officer, an Obersturmführer, is unapologetic and vows they will carry out their genocidal mission.

Kosach makes the collaborator douse the Germans with a can of petrol brought there by Flyora, as a runner approaches bearing a torch lit from the burning village, but the disgusted crowd shoots them all before they can be set on fire. As the partisans leave, Flyora notices a framed portrait of Adolf Hitler in a puddle and proceeds to shoot it numerous times. As he does so, a montage of clips from Hitler's life play in reverse, but when Hitler is shown as a baby on his mother's lap, Flyora stops shooting and cries. A title card informs: "628 Belorussian villages were destroyed, along with all their inhabitants." Flyora rushes to rejoin his comrades, and they march through the birch woods as snow blankets the ground.

Cast
 Aleksei Kravchenko as Flyora/Florian Gaishun
 Olga Mironova as Glasha/Glafira
 Liubomiras Laucevičius as Kosach (voiced by Valery Kravchenko)
 Vladas Bagdonas as Rubezh
 Tatyana Shestakova as Flyora's mother
 Yevgeny Tilicheyev as Gezhel the main collaborator
 Viktors Lorents as Walter Stein the German commander
 Jüri Lumiste as the fanatical German officer

Production
Klimov co-wrote the screenplay with Ales Adamovich, who fought with the Belarusian partisans as a teenager. According to the director's recollections, work on the film began in 1977:

For eight years, filming could not begin because the State Committee for Cinematography (Goskino) would not accept the screenplay, considering it too realistic, calling it propaganda for the "aesthetics of dirtiness" and "naturalism". Alongside this, the death of his wife Larisa Shepitko, also a filmmaker, in 1979 forced him to first complete the work she began on what was to be her next film, Farewell; it would finally be released in 1983. Eventually in 1984, Klimov was able to start filming without having compromised to any censorship at all. The only change became the name of the film itself, to Come and See from the original, Kill Hitler (Klimov also says this in the 2006 UK DVD release).

The film was shot in chronological order over a period of nine months. Kravchenko said that he underwent "the most debilitating fatigue and hunger. I kept a most severe diet, and after the filming was over I returned to school not only thin, but grey-haired." Contrary to what some rumors suggest, though, Kravchenko's hair did not turn permanently grey. In fact, a special Silber Interference Grease-Paint, alongside a thin layer of actual silver, was used to dye his hair. This made it difficult to get it back to normal, so Kravchenko had to live with his hair like this for some time after shooting the film.

To prepare the 14-year-old Kravchenko for the role, Klimov called a hypnotist with autogenic training. "[Kravchenko's acting] could have had a very sad ending. He could have landed in an insane asylum," Klimov said. "I realized I had to inject him with content which he did not possess," "This is an age when a boy does not know what true hatred is, what true love is." "In the end, Mr. Kravchenko was able to concentrate so intensely that it seemed as if he had hypnotized himself for the role."

To create the maximum sense of immediacy, realism, hyperrealism, and surrealism operating in equal measure, Klimov and his cameraman Aleksei Rodionov employed naturalistic colors, widescreen and lots of Steadicam shots; the film is full of extreme close-ups of faces, does not flinch from the unpleasant details of burnt flesh and bloodied corpses, and the guns were often loaded with live ammunition as opposed to blanks. Kravchenko mentioned in interviews that bullets sometimes passed just 4 inches (10 centimeters) above his head (such as in the cow scene). Very little protection was provided on the set. When the dive bombs were detonated the camera crew only had a concrete slab 1.5 meters tall and 5 meters wide to protect them. At the same time the mise-en-scène is fragmentary and disjointed: there are discontinuities between shots as characters appear in close up and then disappear off camera. Klimov employs a range of techniques that draw attention to the camera. The extreme close-ups of actors staring into the camera is a recurring motif. Elsewhere, the moment of revelation is marked by a disorienting zoom-in/dolly-out shot.

Music
The original soundtrack is rhythmically amorphous music composed by Oleg Yanchenko. At a few key points in the film classical music from mainly German or Austrian composers are used, such as The Blue Danube by Johann Strauss II. The Soviet marching song "The Sacred War" and Russian folk song "Korobeiniki" (Vadim Kozin) are played in the movie once. During the scene where Glasha dances, the background music is some fragments of Mary Dixon's song from Grigori Aleksandrov's 1936 film Circus. At the end, during the photographic montage, music by Richard Wagner is used, most notably the "Ride of the Valkyries" from Die Walküre.

At the end of the film, the partisans walk through a winter woodland to the sound of Mozart's Lacrimosa before the camera tilts towards the sky and the ending credits appear. Film critic Roger Ebert commented on this scene as follows:

Meaning of the title
The original Belarusian and Russian title of the film derives from Chapter 6 of the Book of Revelation, where in the first, third, fifth, and seventh verse is written "Ідзі і глядзі" in Belarusian (English: , Greek: , Erchou kai ide and "Иди и смотри" in Russian) as an invitation to look upon the destruction caused by the Four Horsemen of the Apocalypse.  have been cited as being particularly relevant to the film:

And when he had opened the fourth seal, I heard the voice of the fourth beast say, "Come and see!" And I looked, and behold a pale horse: and his name that sat on him was Death, and Hell followed with him. And power was given unto them over the fourth part of the earth, to kill with sword, and with hunger, and with death, and with the beasts of the earth.

Reception and legacy
Come and See had its world premiere in the competition program at the 14th Moscow International Film Festival  It was theatrically released on 17 October 1985, drawing 28.9 million viewers and ranking sixth at the box office of 1986.

2017 restoration
In 2017, the film received an official restoration overseen by Karen Shakhnazarov. It won the Venice Classics Award for Best Restored Film, and was also shown in several European independent cinemas again.

Home media
In 2001 the film was released on DVD in the United States by Kino Lorber. This release is currently out-of-print. The film became available on FilmStruck, the streaming service for the Criterion Collection from its opening on 1 November 2016 to its closing on 29 November 2018, and from November 2019 on the new Criterion Channel service. On 18 December 2019, Janus Films released a trailer for a 2k-restoration that premiered at the Film Forum in New York City on 21 February 2020 with a theatrical run and then a home media release through Criterion was released on 30 June 2020.

Box office
Come and See grossed $71,909 in the United States and Canada, and $20.9 million in other territories, for a worldwide total of nearly $21 million, plus over $1.2 million with home video sales.

Critical response

Contemporary reviews
Initial reception was positive. Walter Goodman wrote for The New York Times that "The history is harrowing and the presentation is graphic ... Powerful material, powerfully rendered ...", and dismissed the ending as "a dose of instant inspirationalism," but conceded to Klimov's "unquestionable talent." Rita Kempley, of The Washington Post, wrote that "directing with an angry eloquence, [Klimov] taps into that hallucinatory nether world of blood and mud and escalating madness that Francis Ford Coppola found in Apocalypse Now. And though he draws a surprisingly vivid performance from his inexperienced teen lead, Klimov's prowess is his visual poetry, muscular and animistic, like compatriot Andrei Konchalovsky's in his epic Siberiade." Mark Le Fanu wrote in Sight & Sound that Come and See is a "powerful war film ... The director has elicited an excellent performance from his central actor Kravchenko".

According to Klimov, the film was so shocking for audiences, however, that ambulances were sometimes called in to take away particularly impressionable viewers, both in the Soviet Union and abroad. During one of the after-the-film discussions, an elderly German man stood up and said: "I was a soldier of the Wehrmacht; moreover, an officer of the Wehrmacht. I traveled through all of Poland and Belarus, finally reaching Ukraine. I will testify: everything that is told in this film is the truth. And the most frightening and shameful thing for me is that this film will be seen by my children and grandchildren".

Retrospective assessments
The film has since been widely acclaimed in the 21st century. In 2001 Daneet Steffens of Entertainment Weekly wrote that "Klimov alternates the horrors of war with occasional fairy tale-like images; together they imbue the film with an unapologetically disturbing quality that persists long after the credits roll."

In 2001, J. Hoberman of The Village Voice reviewed Come and See, writing the following: "Directed for baroque intensity, Come and See is a robust art film with aspirations to the visionary – not so much graphic as leisurely literal-minded in its representation of mass murder. (The movie has been compared both to Schindler's List and Saving Private Ryan, and it would not be surprising to learn that Steven Spielberg had screened it before making either of these.) The film's central atrocity is a barbaric circus of blaring music and barking dogs in which a squadron of drunken German soldiers round up and parade the peasants to their fiery doom ... The bit of actual death-camp corpse footage that Klimov uses is doubly disturbing in that it retrospectively diminishes the care with which he orchestrates the town's destruction. For the most part, he prefers to show the Gorgon as reflected in Perseus's shield. There are few images more indelible than the sight of young Aleksei Kravchenko's fear-petrified expression." In the same publication in 2009, Elliott Stein described Come and See as "a startling mixture of lyrical poeticism and expressionist nightmare."

In 2002, Scott Tobias of The A.V. Club wrote that Klimov's "impressions are unforgettable: the screaming cacophony of a bombing run broken up by the faint sound of a Mozart fugue, a dark, arid field suddenly lit up by eerily beautiful orange flares, German troops appearing like ghosts out of the heavy morning fog. A product of the glasnost era, Come and See is far from a patriotic memorial of Russia's hard-won victory. Instead, it's a chilling reminder of that victory's terrible costs." British magazine The Word wrote that "Come and See is widely regarded as the finest war film ever made, though possibly not by Great Escape fans." Tim Lott wrote in 2009 that the film "makes Apocalypse Now look lightweight".

In 2006, Geoffrey Macnab of Sight & Sound wrote: "Klimov's astonishing war movie combines intense lyricism with the kind of violent bloodletting that would make even Sam Peckinpah pause".

On 16 June 2010, Roger Ebert posted a review of Come and See as part of his "Great Movies" series, describing it as "one of the most devastating films ever about anything, and in it, the survivors must envy the dead ... The film depicts brutality and is occasionally very realistic, but there's an overlay of muted nightmarish exaggeration ... I must not describe the famous sequence at the end. It must unfold as a surprise for you. It pretends to roll back history. You will see how. It is unutterably depressing, because history can never undo itself, and is with us forever."

Come and See appears on many lists of films considered the best. In 2008, Come and See was placed at number 60 on Empire magazine's "The 500 Greatest Movies of All Time" in 2008. It also made Channel 4's list of 50 Films to See Before You Die and was ranked number 24 in Empire magazine's "The 100 Best Films Of World Cinema" in 2010. Phil de Semlyen of Empire has described the work as "Elim  Klimov’s seriously influential, deeply unsettling Belarusian opus. No film – not Apocalypse Now, not Full Metal Jacket – spells out the dehumanizing impact of conflict more vividly, or ferociously ... An impressionist masterpiece and possibly the worst date movie ever." It ranked 154 among critics, and 30 among directors, in the 2012 Sight & Sound polls of the greatest films ever made, while it ranked 104 among critics, and 41 among directors, in the 2022 Sight & Sound polls. The film is generally considered one of the greatest anti-war movies ever made, and one with the most historically accurate depictions of the crimes on the Eastern Front.

On review aggregator Rotten Tomatoes, the film holds an approval rating of 90%, based on 58 reviews, and an average rating of 8.60/10. The website's critics consensus reads, "As effectively anti-war as movies can be, Come and See is a harrowing odyssey through the worst that humanity is capable of, directed with bravura intensity by Elem Klimov."

Klimov did not make any more films after Come and See, leading some critics to speculate as to why. In 2001, Klimov said, "I lost interest in making films ... Everything that was possible I felt I had already done."

Accolades
Come and See was selected as the Soviet entry for the Best Foreign Language Film at the 58th Academy Awards, but was not accepted as a nominee.

See also
 List of Soviet submissions for the Academy Award for Best Foreign Language Film

References

Further reading

External links
 
 
 Come and See on Russian Film Hub
 

1985 drama films
1985 films
1985 in the Soviet Union
1980s German-language films
1980s Russian-language films
1980s war drama films
Animal cruelty incidents in film
Anti-war films about World War II
Apocalyptic films
Belarusian drama films
Belarusian-language films
Belarusian World War II films
Eastern Front of World War II films
Existentialist films
World War II films based on actual events
Films about anti-fascism
Films about fascists
Films about Nazism
Films about orphans
Films directed by Elem Klimov
Films set in 1943
Films set in Belarus
Films set in the Soviet Union
Gang rape in fiction
Metaphysical fiction films
Mosfilm films
Partisan films
Russian war drama films
Russian World War II films
Soviet-era Belarusian films
Soviet war drama films
Soviet World War II films
Works about children in war